Sarral can refer to:

 Sarral, Haripur, a village in Haripur district, Pakistan
 Sarral, Tarragona, a village in Catalonia, Spain